George Edgcumbe may refer to:

 George Edgcumbe, 1st Earl of Mount Edgcumbe (1720–1795), British peer, naval officer and politician, MP for Fowey 1746–61
 George Edgcumbe (1800–1882), British diplomat and politician, MP for Plympton Erle 1826

See also 
 George Edgecumbe (1845–1930), New Zealand newspaper proprietor and businessman
 Edgcumbe (disambiguation)